Black Ladinos (Spanish: negros ladinos) were Hispanicized black Ladinos, exiled to Spanish America after having spent time in Spain.

They were referred to as negros ladinos ("cultivated" or "latinized Blacks"), as opposed to negros bozales ("uneducated Blacks"), i.e. those captured in Africa. The Ladinos' skills granted them a higher price than those of bozales.

Black Ladinos born in the Americas were negros criollos ("Creole Blacks", cf. Creoles of color).

History
Prior to the arrival of Columbus to the Americas, there were Black people who either lived as free men, were brought through the Arab slave trade, or the Castilian or Portuguese colonization of Africa.
After some time in Spanish society, those Africans became Christianized and learned Spanish.
There were 50,000 Black Ladinos in Spain in the 15th century. Although Black ladinos came from many parts of the African continent, most had their origins in the Upper Guinea region, including modern day Senegal, Mali, Mauritania, and Guinea.

After the initial stages of the Spanish colonization of the Americas showed that Amerindians were not suitable for the labour that the conquerors required (mainly due to the Eurasian illnesses unknown in the Americas), Nicolás de Ovando decided to bring slaves from Spain.
Between 1502 and 1518, Castile exiled hundreds of black slaves, primarily to work as miners. Opponents of their enslavement cited their Christian faith and their repeated attempts of escape to the mountains or to join the Native Americans in revolt. Proponents declared that the rapid diminution of the Native American population required a consistent supply of reliable low-cost workers. Free Spaniards were reluctant to do manual labor or to remain settled (especially after the discovery of gold on the mainland), and only slave labor assured the economic viability of the colonies.

Examples
 Estevanico (c. 1500–1539), a Berber captured by the Portuguese and sold to a Spanish Conquistador.
 The slaves in the schooner La Amistad were Mendes captured in Africa but were described as Ladinos by their Cuban buyers to avoid the ban on international slave trade.

See also
 Afro-Spaniard: Current inhabitants of Spain of African descent.
 Emancipados: Black Spanish Guineans who enjoyed a special status by their Roman Catholic and Spanish education.
 Seasoning (colonialism)

References

External links
 La procedencia de los esclavos negros en Sevilla, "The provenience of black slaves in Seville".
  Léxico Hispanoamericano del siglo 16, page 515, Peter Boyd-Bowman, Tamesis, 1971. Examples of the usage of ladino in 16th-century Spanish.
 Hermandad Los Negritos, a Roman Catholic brotherhood in Seville, claiming to date from the 14th century, originally for Black Christians.

Spanish language
Spanish colonization of the Americas
Former peoples of the African diaspora
Spanish slaves
Latin American caste system